Harry Linley Richardson (1878–1947) was a New Zealand artist and art teacher, stamp designer. He was born in Peckham Rye, Surrey, England in 1878.

References

External links

1878 births
1947 deaths
New Zealand artists
New Zealand philatelists
New Zealand art teachers
People from Surrey (before 1889)
English emigrants to New Zealand
Burials at Karori Cemetery